Kid Icarus is a series of fantasy video games by Nintendo. The games are set in a Greco-Roman fantasy world based on Greek mythology, called "Angel Land". The gameplay consists of a mixture of action, adventure and platform elements. The Kid Icarus franchise is known as a cult classic and a sibling series to the Metroid franchise.

The first installment, Kid Icarus, was released in 1986 for the Nintendo Entertainment System and was received to critical acclaim despite poor sales. A sequel, Kid Icarus: Of Myths and Monsters, was later released for the Game Boy. After a 20-year hiatus, Kid Icarus: Uprising was released in 2012 for the Nintendo 3DS handheld.

Plot

Characters

The Kid Icarus series has a cast of recurring characters. Some common characters in the series include Pit (the main character), Palutena, Viridi, Hades, Magnus, Dark Pit, Medusa, Pyrrhon, Pandora, Arlon, Poseidon, Phosphora, Dyntos, Thanatos and Cragalanche.

Development

After Nintendo's release of commercially successful platforming games in the 1980s, including Donkey Kong, Ice Climber, and Super Mario Bros., as well as the critically acclaimed adventure game The Legend of Zelda, the company was interested in entering a different genre. They began work on an action game. The game was called Metroid. Nintendo released Metroid for the Family Computer Disk System on August 6, 1986, and on the Nintendo Entertainment System one year later. Kid Icarus was developed alongside as its sister game, as it shares elements and programmers with Metroid. The game was produced by the same man who produced Metroid, Gunpei Yokoi, who previously produced Donkey Kong, Donkey Kong Junior (1982) and the original Mario Bros. (1983), and it featured music written by Hirokazu Tanaka, who also composed for Duck Hunt (1984).

After the release of its handheld sequel, Kid Icarus: Of Myths and Monsters, the series received no new installments for two decades. During 1990s, a different gaming magazine claimed another project named Kid Icarus: Angel Land Story, sometimes called Super Kid Icarus, to exist in-work for Super NES though it is unknown if the source is real or not. An installment for the Nintendo 64 was rumored to be in development, but was never released. During early 2000s, Capcom moved their resources to redo Dead Phoenix into new untitled Icarus game, to debut on GameCube. A series revival was planned for Wii, developed by Factor 5, but this appearance eventually led to cancellation. In 2008, Pit appeared in Super Smash Bros. Brawl with a new design. During their E3 event in 2010, Nintendo unveiled Kid Icarus: Uprising for the Nintendo 3DS, the first game in the series since 1991. The game was released in March 2012 to positive reviews from critics. Palutena and Dark Pit appeared later in Super Smash Bros. for Nintendo 3DS and Wii U. Pit, Palutena, and Dark Pit returned, alongside all previous characters, in Super Smash Bros. Ultimate.

Notes

References

Nintendo franchises
Video game franchises introduced in 1986